Jessie Wicker Bell or Lady Sheba (July 18, 1920 – 2002) was a writer of the U.S. Wiccan Celtic Tradition and founder of the American Order of the Brotherhood of the Wicca with the aim to unite all practitioners of Wicca (covens, groups, traditions). 

Born in Kentucky, Bell's family introduced her to their Celtic heritage; her grandmother told her stories about leprechauns and fairies. She claimed that her family had practiced witchcraft for 7 generations, and that she had led many previous lives. Her own grandmother introduced her to craft when she was just 6 years old and taught her the lore of the Irish Fairy Folk and the Spirit Guides of the Cherokee. She also claimed to have inherited psychic abilities and been granted the “Hand of Power”, which enabled her to protect others. 

In 1971, Lady Sheba published The Book of Shadows and founded the American Order of the Brotherhood of the Wicca, an offshoot of Gardnerian Wicca. The book was controversial, as it revealed information that other Wiccans tended to keep secret. Lady Sheba appointed herself high priestess of the order and worked to expand its influence. Other covens, both within and outside the United States, were formed under its umbrella, and she began referring to herself as Witch Queen over the new groups. Many Wiccans objected to her use of the title. By 1972, Lady Sheba estimated the American population of witches at over 100,000, and the Star Tribune called her "the head of all witches in the United States".

Bibliography
 1971 - The Book of Shadows (Llewellyn Publications) 
 1972 - The Grimoire of Lady Sheba (Llewellyn Publications)

References

Works cited
 
 

1920 births
2002 deaths
American Wiccans
Wiccan writers
Women religious writers
20th-century American women writers